The 1996 Star World Championships were held in Rio de Janeiro, Brazil between January 9 and 21, 1996. The hosting yacht club was Iate Clube do Rio de Janeiro.

Results

References

Star World Championships
1996 in sailing
Sailing competitions in Brazil